is a Japanese professional boxer, who has held the WBO Asia Pacific bantamweight title since 2021.

Professional boxing career
Nishida began boxing while attending the Nara Prefectural Oji Technical High School, during which time he won the national high school boxing tournament. Nishida continued training boxing at the Rokushima Boxing Gym while attending the Kindai University, but stopped training after graduating to work in the food industry. He once again took up boxing early in 2019. Nishida made his professional boxing debut against Sakol Ketkul on 3 October 2019. He won the fight by a first-round technical knockout.

Nishida faced the journeyman Pablito Canada in his second professional six-round bout on 22 December 2019. He won the fight by unanimous decision, with all three judges scoring the fight 60–52 in his favor. Nishida faced the former Japanese bantamweight champion Shohei Omori in his first eight round bout on 19 December 2020. He won the fight by unanimous decision, with scores of 79–73, 78–74 and 78–74.

After winning his first three professional fights, Nishida was booked to challenge the former WBC flyweight and reigning WBO Asia Pacific bantamweight champion Daigo Higa on 24 April 2021. Nishida captured his first professional title by unanimous decision, with two scorecards of 117–111 and one scorecard of 118–110.

Nishida made his first WBO Asia Pacific bantamweight title defense against Tetsuro Ohashi on 19 December 2021, in the main event of a "Muto Promotions" card which took place at the Sumiyoshi Ward Center in Osaka, Japan. He won the fight by unanimous decision, with scores of 118–110, 119–109 and 116–112.

Nishida made his second WBO Asia Pacific title defense against the #15 ranked OPBF bantamweight contender Aljum Pelesio. The title bout headlined the "You Will Be the Champion 14" event, which took place at the Sumiyoshi Ward Center in Osaka, Japan on 9 October 2022. He won the fight by unanimous decision, with all three judges awarding him all ten rounds of the bout.

Nishida made his third WBO Asia Pacific title defense against Songsaeng Phoyaem, in the main event of "3150 FIGHT SURVIVAL", which took place on 1 April 2023 at the EDION Arena Osaka in Osaka, Japan.

Professional boxing record

References

Living people
1996 births
Japanese male boxers
Sportspeople from Nara Prefecture
Bantamweight boxers
Super-bantamweight boxers
21st-century Japanese people